The PowerBook Duo is a line of subnotebooks manufactured and sold by Apple Computer from 1992 until 1997 as a more compact companion to the PowerBook line. Improving upon the PowerBook 100's portability (its immediate predecessor and Apple's third-smallest laptop), the Duo came in seven different models. They were the Duo 210, 230, 250, 270c, 280, 280c, and 2300c, with the 210 and 230 being the earliest, and the 2300c being the final incarnation before the entire line was dropped in early 1997.

Only the MacBook Air, the  Retina MacBook Pro and the  Retina MacBook weigh less, though they are wider and deeper (but considerably thinner). The Duo had the most in common with the original MacBook Air which only included one USB 2.0 port, one video port (requiring an adapter) and one speaker port, but no ability for expansion.

The PowerBook Duo line was replaced by the PowerBook 2400, which was slightly larger in size than the Duos, but still only the fifth-smallest behind the 12-inch PowerBook G4 which succeeded it as fourth-smallest. Although both featured much more onboard functionality, they lacked docking ability.

Features

The Duo line offered an ultraportable design that was light and functional for travel and expandable via its unique docking connector. However certain compromises were made to achieve this level of portability. The Duo series used an 88% of standard desktop-sized keyboard which was criticized for being difficult to type on. Likewise, the trackball was reduced in size from even that used on the PowerBook 100. The only usable port which came standard on the Duo was a dual printer/modem EIA-422 serial port.

There was a slot for an expensive, optional, internal 14.4 Express Modem and no provision for built-in Ethernet. This somewhat limited configuration meant the only way to move data in or out of the laptop in a stock configuration, without purchasing additional accessories, was via a relatively slow AppleTalk connection, which was not practical in the event of hard drive problems. Compensating for these limitations, the initial Duo offering provided for a considerably higher RAM limit of 24 MB (as compared to the 100 series' 14 MB), and a standard 80 MB hard drive (versus the 100's 40 MB drive). The debut year for the Duo only offered a passive matrix display on both the mid-level and high-end models, in contrast to the high-end of the PowerBook 100 series - the PowerBook 170 and 180 (in which the Duos shared the same processors). With their crisp active matrix displays, both were already in great demand over the lower-powered models with passive matrix displays. The following year, Apple replaced the Duo models with both an active matrix display and a color active matrix display, the latter becoming the de facto standard of the PowerBook line. The respective Duo models are easily differentiated by their display method and processor. All other features are identical.

Specifications

The 200–series Duos were powered by either Motorola 68030 or 68LC040 processors, ranging from 25–33 MHz. When Apple debuted its next-generation PowerPC processors in 1994, it took over a year for the first PowerPC Duo (the 2300c) to debut. The original PowerPC 601, like the original 68040 before it, produced too much heat and consumed too much power for Apple to use in any laptop but, by the end of 1995, the more efficient PowerPC 603e had been developed, which was featured in the Duo 2300c and its full-size companion, the PowerBook 5300 series. The PowerPC 603e was designed for a 64–bit bus, but was engineered by Apple to run on an older 32–bit bus to maintain compatibility with the Duo Docks. This led to poor system and video performance.

Docking stations

PowerBook Duos lacked most common ports (featuring only one internal printer/modem serial port and an optional fax/modem card port). In their place was docking ability, accomplished via a unique 156-pin Processor Direct Slot (PDS) giving the docks full access to the Duo's central processing unit (CPU) and data buses. Several dock options were offered by Apple and third parties.

Duo Dock (M7779) (1992), Duo Dock II (1994), Duo Dock Plus (1995)

This was the largest and most expensive dock for the PowerBook Duo, in a form factor common for that period: the Duo Dock (M7779) was first offered by Apple on October 19, 1992, and the similar docks presented by Compaq (as the LTE Lite Desktop Expansion Base) and IBM (as the 3550 Expansion Unit) were introduced in the same year. Unlike the smaller docks, or "port replicators" that plugged into the back of laptops, the listed docks pulled the laptop inside the dock's metal and plastic case via an internal sliding mechanism (similar to that of a VHS player). The Duo Dock turned the PowerBook Duo into a full-size, AC-powered, fully functional desktop computer with all the standard ports. Like a desktop computer, the dock could physically support a heavy, high-resolution CRT display on top. The Duo Dock included a floppy drive on the side, two NuBus expansion slots, an optional floating-point unit (FPU), level 2 cache, a slot for more VRAM to enable more colors at higher resolutions, and space for a second hard drive.

The original Duo Dock was replaced by the Duo Dock II on May 16, 1994, which added AAUI networking and compatibility with the newer color-screen PowerBook Duos. A replacement lid was offered to allow use of the thicker color Duos with the original Duo Dock. 

The Dock II was followed by the Duo Dock Plus on May 15, 1995, which was identical to the Duo Dock II, but lacked the FPU and level 2 cache—which were not compatible with the 68LC040-processor Duo 280 and PowerPC-processor Duo 2300c. While the laptop's LCD display obviously could not be opened when inside the dock, additional NuBus video cards could be installed to drive up to three monitors.

Aging Duo Docks are known to have problems with the failing of the capacitors which drive the docking mechanism. This is colloquially known as 'The Duo Dock Tick of Death'.

MiniDock (M7780) (1992)

The Mini Dock was a port expander for the PowerBook Duo and was popularly offered by many third-party manufacturers and Apple. When attached, the PowerBook Duo could be plugged into various standard desktop devices including SCSI, Apple Desktop Bus (ADB), serial, floppy disk, external speakers, and an external display. This type of dock also allowed the Duo's internal LCD and battery to be used. Third-party contributions to the Mini Dock added a variety of specialized custom options including Ethernet connectivity, NTSC and PAL video ports. The only significant difference between these docks and a full desktop configuration was the lack of custom PDS or NuBus expansion slots, which were included on all standard desktop Macs, a shortfall made up in task-specific third-party dock offerings.

MicroDock

This type of dock was manufactured by both Apple and many third parties, and gave the PowerBook Duo up to three extra ports in a minimal configuration. Examples include floppy, SCSI, video and Ethernet docks, each typically included one ADB port as well. This was the least expensive, and most basic of the docks. This type of dock allowed the Duo's internal LCD to be used as well, and could run on the Duo's internal battery for a reduced amount of time. Popular due to the minimal impact in accessories that must be carried with the Duo, they offered a practical alternative to emergency hard disk and software situations and task-specific needs.

Design

The 2300 was the last Apple product to carry any vestige of the Snow White design language, which Apple had been phasing out since 1990. Drawing heavily upon improvements made to the original PowerBook 140 design, the Duo series continues many of the styling traits of the PowerBook 100, which is approximately equivalent in size and weight. In addition to the Snow White features, the Duo takes the 100's radius curves a step further along the display top, front, and sides, and which is also heavily mirrored in the various docks.

PenLite

The PenLite was an early tablet computer prototyped by Apple Computer in 1993 around the same time as the Apple Newton. It was not a PDA but rather a complete computer. The project was canceled in 1994 due to its similarity to the Newton.

The PenLite was based on the PowerBook Duo and was meant to be a tablet-style addition, with a stylus as the input device. It was designed to be compatible with PowerBook Duo docks and accessories and ran the standard classic Mac OS.

In popular culture

One of the most stylish and iconic of the laptops available at the time, the Duo was widely used in advertising, film and television.
 Sandra Bullock, starring as systems analyst Angela Bennett, prominently uses a PowerBook Duo 280c (and also a PowerBook 540c) in the movie The Net (1995)
 In the TV sitcom Home Improvement, a Powerbook Duo was used in the fifth episode of season 6 (Episode #131: Al's Video - Original air date: October 15, 1996) as Jill's new computer. Just as she gets some work done on it, Tim comes along and destroys it by playing a game.
 Anne Heche, playing Amy Barnes, a geologist and seismologist, uses a PowerBook Duo 280c in the movie Volcano (1997) to calculate the speed of lava flowing beneath the city streets.
 In the film Wag The Dog (1997), the President's team members, including Anne Heche and Dustin Hoffman among others, use several PowerBook Duo 280c.
 In the critically acclaimed TV sitcom NewsRadio (1994-1999), Dave Nelson used a PowerBook Duo almost exclusively for the first four seasons, the only exceptions being the first few episodes in which he used a PowerBook 100 series. In the fourth season (beginning in 1997), PowerBook Duos were also used prominently by Lisa Miller and occasionally by other characters. In the fifth season (beginning in 1998), all computers on the show were replaced with PowerBook G3s and a first-generation iMac.
 A complete PowerBook Duo system, including Dock, is featured prominently throughout seasons five through seven of Seinfeld.
 In the movie Hackers (1995), Kate Libby owns a PowerBook Duo 280c (with a 2300c logic board infamously remarked to have a "28.8 bps modem" The 28.8 for the 2300 was never produced and remained a prototype only). She claims it has a "P6 chip". While people believed she was referring to the Intel Pentium Pro, it was actually a PowerPC 603e in the 2300 motherboard (which was referred to by Apple as the "P6" chip for marketing purposes.) Dade Murphy is sent a clear-cased prototype 280c[1] by Eugene "The Plague" Belford.

Timeline

See also
 List of Macintosh models grouped by CPU type
 Docking station

Notes

References

External links
 collection of powerbooks and duos
 PowerBook Duo Resources
 German PowerBook Duo Site
 Lowendmac.com - PowerBooks
 Prototypes of Apple hardware at The Apple Museum
 Prototypes of Apple hardware at The Apple Collection
 Apple Powerbook Duo 2300c Pictures
 20 Macs for 2020 podcast #19

Duo
68k Macintosh computers
PowerPC Macintosh computers
Computer-related introductions in 1992